Herichthys teporatus, also known as the Soto la Marina cichlid, is a species of cichlid fish endemic to Mexico where it occurs in the Soto La Marina River drainage in the state of Tamaulipas.

References

teporatus
Endemic fish of Mexico
Freshwater fish of Mexico
Natural history of Tamaulipas
Cichlid fish of North America
Fish described in 1903